Market Street Depot was the primary intercity railway station in San Jose, California between 1883 and 1935. It was located at Market and Bassett Streets at the end of the former San Francisco and San Jose Railroad, a route which was later integrated into the Southern Pacific Railroad Coast Line.

History
The station building was constructed in 1883, replacing the former San Francisco and San Jose Railroad end of line facilities that facilitated passengers and freight since the road's completion.

Completion of the Coast Line to Los Angeles as well as the Bayshore Cutoff near San Francisco greatly increased the rail traffic running through downtown San Jose in the early 1900s — combining the increase in personal automobile use made for greatly increased delays on local streets. As a result, efforts were undertaken by the city to divert the rail line off of Fourth Street. This necessitated extensive grade crossings, new trackage, and a new San Jose depot located at Cahill Street, later named Diridon station. After December 1935, passenger operations were shifted away from the Market Street Depot in favor of the new facility and the tracks on Fourth Street were removed. The passenger facilities were subsequently demolished, but the adjoining freight depot continued service until the mid 1900s.

References

Railway stations in San Jose, California
Railway stations in the United States opened in 1883
Railway stations closed in 1935
Demolished buildings and structures in California
Demolished railway stations in the United States
San Jose
1883 establishments in California
1935 disestablishments in California